"Love Reaction" is a single by American performance artist Divine, released in 1983. The song was later reissued on the 1984 compilation album The Story So Far.

Chart performance
"Love Reaction" became Divine's third single to chart on the Dutch Singles Chart.  It debuted at #35 before climbing to and peaking at #25 in its second week.  The song spent a total of 4 weeks on the chart.

"Love Reaction" spent a total of 7 weeks on the German Singles Chart and peaked at #55.  It spent one week at its peak.

Track listings
Dutch Vinyl, 12-inch single
 "Love Reaction" - 5:31
 "Love Reaction (Radio Version)" - 3:20
 "Love Reaction (Instrumental)" - 5:00

German Vinyl, 12-inch single
 "Love Reaction (Album Version)" - 5:34
 "Love Reaction (Special Maxi Version)" - 6:58
 "Love Reaction (Instrumental Version)" - 4:04

Charts

References

External links
 New Order covering "Love Reaction"

1983 singles
Divine (performer) songs
1983 songs
Songs written by Bobby Orlando
Song recordings produced by Bobby Orlando